Odo Morannal Reuter (28 April 1850 – 2 September 1913) was a Swedo-Finnish zoologist and poet.

Early life

He was born in Åbo on 28 April 1850, and died there on 2 September 1913. Reuter became a student at the University of Helsinki in 1867. He gained his master's degree in 1873, followed by a doctorate in 1877, when he became an associate professor of zoology.

Career

Reuter was a hemipterist, a specialist in mirid plant bugs, becoming the world's leading expert in this group at his time. He coined the term "parasitoid" to describe the way of life of species such as many wasps which feed on but do not immediately kill their prey.

Later life

He formally retired in 1910 due to long-term health problems. His enthusiasm remained, and in 1911, despite his blindness, he published Nattens sånger (Night's Songs) describing the experiences of his latter years. He died on 2 September 1913 in Turku.

Works
Reuter's many publications on entomology include:

 Revisio critica Capsinarum praecipue Scandinaviae et Fenniae, väitöskirja. 1875
 Hemiptera Gymnoceratae Europae I-V. 1878–1896
 Ad cognitionem Reduviidarum. 1881
 Monographia Anthocoridarum orbis terrestris. 1885
 Nya rön om myrornas omtviflade medlidande och hjälpsamhet.  1888 
 Revisio synonymica Heteropterarum palearcticarum. 1888
 Corrodentia Fennica. 1892
 Ängsmasken, dess härjningar i Finland och medlen till deras bekämpande. Finska Hushållningssällskapet, Åbo 1892 
 Monographia Ceratocombidarum orbis terrestris. 1893
 Monographia generis Holotrichius Burm.  1893
 Monographia generis Reduvius Fabr., Lam.  1893
 Ängsmasken 2, Berättelse öfver en på K. Finska hushållningssällskapets bekostnad sommaren 1892 företagen resa i och för studium af ängsmasken och de naturenliga medlen till dess utrotande.  Finska Hushållningssällskapet, Åbo 1893 
 Ängsmasken 3,Berättelse öfver på K. Finska hushållningssällskapet bekostnad sommaren 1893 företagna undersökningar om ängsmasken och medlen till dess utrotande.  Finska Hushållningssällskapet, Åbo 1894 
 Neuroptera fennica : förteckning och beskrifning öfver Finlands Neuropterer.  1894 
 Species palæarcticae generis Acanthia Fabr., Latr.  1895
 Species palaearcticae generis Acanthia Fabr., Latr. dispositae.  1896
 Skadeinsekter i våra fruktträdgårdar.  1897 
 Thysaunoptera Fennica : förteckning och beskrifning öfver finska Thysanoptera. 1898–1899 
 Monographia generis Heteropterorum Phimodera Germ. Cum tabulis duabus.  1908
 Monographia Nabidarum orbis terrestris : pars prior : cum tabula colorata.  1910 (B. Poppiuksen kanssa)
 Insekternas levnadsvanor och instinkter intill gryningen av de sociala instinkterna.  1913

References

External links
 

1850 births
1913 deaths
Finnish entomologists
Hemipterists
Finnish zoologists
People from Turku
Swedish-speaking Finns